Granville Bennett may refer to:
Granville G. Bennett (1833–1910), American lawyer, justice of the Supreme Court for the Dakota Territory, delegate to the U.S. House of Representatives
Granville Gaylord Bennett (bishop) (1883–1975), American Episcopal bishop
Granville Bennett, fictionalised name of Denton Pette, small-animal veterinarian immortalised in the books of James Herriot